Shri Balwant Institute of Technology (SBIT) is an Engineering and Management institute based in NCR Delhi, India. It is approved by AICTE, Ministry of Education, Government of India and affiliated to GGS IP University, New Delhi. SBIT is the part of SB Group of Institutions.

Location 
The campus of the institute occupies over 20 acres in NCR Delhi. It is about 15 min drive from Delhi border and located adjacent to the Rajiv Gandhi Education City. It is adjacent to Meerut Road from where Uttar Pradesh border is 10 km, Delhi border is 18 km and 6.5 km from National Highway1.

Programmes 
 B.Tech
 B.Tech (Lateral)
 MCA
 MCA (Lateral)
 MBA
 BBA
 BCA

References

External links 
  - www.sbit.in

Engineering colleges in Delhi